Heart of TARDIS is a BBC Books original novel written by Dave Stone and based on the long-running British science fiction television series Doctor Who. It features both the Second and Fourth Doctors with Jamie, Victoria, and Romana I.

Plot

Each Doctor has to deal with different ends of the same crisis involving a dimensional anomaly created by an American experiment, the Second accidentally materialising the TARDIS in a town that has been trapped in the anomaly while the Fourth is forcibly recruited to repair the equipment that created the anomaly. Although neither Doctor ever meets the other, the Fourth Doctor and Romana do travel to the Second's TARDIS to allow him to gain access when the anomaly renders the ship's interior inaccessible from the outside; when the Second Doctor enters, the Fourth Doctor and Romana subsequently hide under the console on the opposite side from the Second in order to escape detection, the Fourth stating that meeting himself would make things too complicated.

External links
The Cloister Library - Heart of TARDIS

2000 British novels
2000 science fiction novels
Past Doctor Adventures
Second Doctor novels
Fourth Doctor novels
Doctor Who multi-Doctor stories
Novels by Dave Stone
British science fiction novels